Fox Island is an uninhabited island in Lake Kipawa, Quebec. The island lies to the west of Île au Chevreuil and has some accommodation facilities.

References 

Lake islands of Quebec